The Department of Genetics is a department of the University of Cambridge that conducts research and teaching in genetics.

Research
, the department has 83 researchers over 27 research groups, studying functional genomics, systems biology, developmental biology, cell biology, epigenetic inheritance, microbial genetics and evolution and population genetics.

Notable academic staff
 Anne Ferguson-Smith , Arthur Balfour Professor of Genetics, Head of the Department
 Richard Durbin FRS, Honorary Professor of Computational genomics, Senior Group Leader at the Wellcome Trust Sanger Institute
 Julie Ahringer FMedSci, Professor of Genetics and Genomics, Wellcome Trust Senior Research Fellow, and Director of the Gurdon Institute
 David Glover FRS FRSE, Wellcome Investigator in the Department of Genetics, formerly Balfour Professor of Genetics

, the department also has 50-65 graduate students and about 30 Part II Tripos undergraduate students.

Emeritus and alumni
Notable alumni of the department include:
 Reginald Punnett , inventor of the Punnett Square
 Michael Ashburner , gene ontologist and co-founder of the European Bioinformatics Institute (EBI)
Ronald Fisher, statistical geneticist, who has been described as “a genius who almost single-handedly created the foundations for modern statistical science”.

References

Genetics, Department of
Genetics education
Genetics in the United Kingdom